Fernanda "Fe" Palermo Licen (born 18 August 1996) is a Brazilian professional footballer who plays as a left back for São Paulo and the Brazil women's national team.

Career statistics

International

References

1996 births
Living people
Sportspeople from Campinas
Brazilian women's footballers
Women's association football fullbacks
Santos FC (women) players
São Paulo FC (women) players
Brazil women's international footballers
Campeonato Brasileiro de Futebol Feminino Série A1 players
Clube de Regatas do Flamengo (women) players
Associação Acadêmica e Desportiva Vitória das Tabocas players
Sociedade Esportiva Kindermann players